Nico Cedric Schlotterbeck (born 1 December 1999) is a German professional footballer who plays as a centre-back for Bundesliga club Borussia Dortmund and the Germany national team.

Club career

SC Freiburg 
Schlotterbeck debuted for SC Freiburg on 9 March 2019, coming on as a half-time substitute for Philipp Lienhart in the 2–1 home win against Hertha BSC. In his final match for Freiburg, the club lost the DFB-Pokal Final on penalties but Schlotterbeck was awarded the man of the match.

Loan to Union Berlin 
On 31 July 2020, Schlotterbeck joined Union Berlin on a one-year loan.

Borussia Dortmund 
On 2 May 2022, Borussia Dortmund announced the signing of Schlotterbeck on a five-year deal, starting from the 2022–23 season. He joined for a reported €25 million transfer fee.

International career
Schlotterbeck got his debut call-up to the Germany national team under coach Hansi Flick for FIFA World Cup qualification in September 2021. He made his debut against Israel in a friendly on 27 March 2022.

Personal life
Schlotterbeck is the nephew of former professional footballer Niels Schlotterbeck, who played for Freiburg. His older brother, Keven, is a professional footballer who played the 2019–20 season at Union Berlin on loan from SC Freiburg, to which he returned for the 2020–21 season.  Schlotterbeck's cousin, Sandrine, appeared on the seventh series of the German edition of Love Island in 2022.

Career statistics

Club

International

Honours
SC Freiburg
DFB-Pokal runner-up: 2021-22

Germany U21
UEFA European Under-21 Championship: 2021

Individual
UEFA European Under-21 Championship Team of the Tournament: 2021
Bundesliga Team of the Season: 2021–22
 kicker Bundesliga Team of the Season: 2021–22

References

External links
Profile at the Borussia Dortmund website

1999 births
Living people
German footballers
Footballers from Baden-Württemberg
Association football central defenders
Germany youth international footballers
Germany under-21 international footballers
Germany international footballers
SC Freiburg II players
SC Freiburg players
1. FC Union Berlin players
Borussia Dortmund players
Bundesliga players
Regionalliga players
2022 FIFA World Cup players
People from Rems-Murr-Kreis
Sportspeople from Stuttgart (region)